Christofer Eskilsson (born 20 April 1989, Malmö) is a Swedish diver. He competed for Sweden at the 2012 Summer Olympics in the 10 m platform diving event, finishing in 25th place.  He competes for the club, Malmö KK.

References

Swedish male divers
Divers at the 2012 Summer Olympics
Olympic divers of Sweden
1989 births
Living people
Sportspeople from Malmö